The 2005–06 season was the 108th season of competitive football played by Arsenal. It was the final season in which home matches were played at the club's Highbury stadium after 93 years; Arsenal intended to move to its new 60,000 capacity Emirates Stadium in time for the following season. The club ended their Premier League campaign in fourth, having pipped local rivals Tottenham Hotspur to the position on the final day. Arsenal became the first London club to reach a UEFA Champions League final, though lost 2–1 to Barcelona in Paris. In the League Cup the club was eliminated in the semi-finals on aggregate score by Wigan Athletic and knocked out of the FA Cup, against Bolton Wanderers in the fourth round.

Before the season commenced midfielder Patrick Vieira was sold to Juventus; striker Thierry Henry assumed his club captaincy role. Alexander Hleb was purchased from Stuttgart for an undisclosed fee in July 2005; in the winter transfer window Arsenal signed midfielder Abou Diaby, and forwards Emmanuel Adebayor and Theo Walcott.

Arsenal lost to league champions Chelsea in the 2005 FA Community Shield at the Millennium Stadium. An indifferent start in the league saw Arsenal peak in second position after 13 matches, but a run of three consecutive defeats a month later had effectively ruled them out of title contention. On the final day, they beat Wigan Athletic 4–2 at Highbury; Tottenham Hotspur's defeat at West Ham United meant Arsenal secured fourth place. The team's performances in Europe were more striking; they eliminated Real Madrid, Juventus and Villarreal in the knockout stages. In the 2006 UEFA Champions League Final held at the Stade de France in Paris on 17 May 2006, goalkeeper Jens Lehmann was sent off for a professional foul on Barcelona's Samuel Eto'o. Although defender Sol Campbell gave Arsenal a first half lead from a set piece, the team conceded twice in the final 15 minutes to lose the match.

To mark the final season at Highbury, Arsenal held a valedictory campaign titled "Highbury – The Final Salute". The club staged several themed matchdays and a redcurrant home kit replaced the common red to honour the shirts worn in 1913.

Background

Arsenal began the preceding season as league champions; a win against Blackburn Rovers in August 2004 ensured they eclipsed Nottingham Forest's record of 42 league matches unbeaten. The run extended to six more matches, before losing 2–0 to Manchester United at Old Trafford on 24 October 2004. Poor form throughout November allowed league leaders Chelsea to extend the gap at the top; Wenger conceded retaining the title in April 2005, calling his opponents "worthy champions ... they have been remarkably consistent." A run of twelve league matches unbeaten, culminating in a 7–0 home win against Everton helped Arsenal finish in second place. In spite of exiting the Champions League to Bayern Munich in the second round, the team won the 2005 FA Cup Final against Manchester United – winning 5–4 on penalties after a goalless draw.

Highbury – The Final Salute

The 2005–06 season marked Arsenal's final season at Highbury, their home since 1913. The club planned to move half a mile to the Emirates Stadium, considered "vital to our future" by Wenger, as it financially would help them to compete at the top level. To mark the valedictory campaign titled "Highbury – The Final Salute", the club staged many special activities on matchdays "...to celebrate the many great players and moments that this fantastic stadium has witnessed." A redcurrant home kit was designed to honour the shirts worn in the club's first season at Highbury. It was adorned with gold lettering and accompanied by white shorts and redcurrant socks.

Transfers
Arsenal signed youth players Nicklas Bendtner, Vito Mannone and Armand Traoré in the summer transfer window. Belarusian Alexander Hleb joined the club for an undisclosed fee on 12 July 2005. Arsenal made four more additions during the season: goalkeeper Mart Poom, signed on a permanent deal, midfielder Abou Diaby, who reportedly turned down an offer to join Chelsea and forwards Emmanuel Adebayor and Theo Walcott.

After the early departures of Jermaine Pennant and Stuart Taylor, club captain Patrick Vieira joined Italian side Juventus in a £13.7 million deal. Wenger did not intend to sign a replacement, saying "I am not in a hurry. We have Gilberto, Flamini, and Fàbregas. Pires can play in there also so we have plenty of players." English midfielder David Bentley made his loan deal at Blackburn Rovers permanent in the January transfer window.

In

Out

Loans in

Loans out

Pre-season

FA Community Shield

As winners of the FA Cup in the previous season, Arsenal contested the 2005 FA Community Shield against league champions Chelsea. Two goals scored by striker Didier Drogba in either half meant Arsenal lost the match. Wenger commented afterwards that Chelsea's gameplan made it difficult for the Arsenal defenders, and noted his opposition's strength was playing long balls. When asked if he was concerned by the performance, Wenger replied: "Why should I worry? Did you see the game? You can worry for the Chelsea supporters."

Premier League

August–October

Arsenal began their final league season at Highbury against Newcastle United on 14 August 2005. In spite of having a man advantage after midfielder Jermaine Jenas was sent off for a challenge on Gilberto Silva, striker Thierry Henry scored from the penalty spot in the 81st minute. Robin van Persie added a second, four minutes from the end of the match. A fortunate goal from Drogba inflicted Arsenal's first defeat against Chelsea in the league for almost a decade. The team responded with a 4–1 victory against Fulham, whereby Henry and defender Pascal Cygan both scored twice. Arsenal lost away to Middlesbrough on 10 September 2005, in a performance derided by Wenger as being "unacceptable". A brace (two goals) from Sol Campbell against Everton was followed by a goalless draw against newly promoted West Ham United.

An own goal scored by Stephen Clemence gave Arsenal a 1–0 victory in the first week of October at home to Birmingham City. Despite being "technically the better side" away to West Bromwich Albion, Arsenal lost 2–1; Wenger after the match commented that the team "played with great spirit but … were punished for a lack of experience and maturity because we didn't take advantage of the chances we created." A penalty scored by Robert Pires was enough to secure three points against Manchester City. The midfielder wasted a second penalty in the second half, choosing to recreate a spot kick executed by Johan Cruyff and Jesper Olsen for Ajax. Having attempted to roll the ball towards onrushing Henry, Pires inadvertently flicked the ball twice, enabling referee Mike Riley to award a free-kick to Manchester City. Although both players were scrutinised by Chelsea manager José Mourinho, they were commended by Cryuff for showing a desire to try something different. The final league match of October ended in a 1–1 draw against local rivals Tottenham Hotpsur.

November–February

A 3–1 win at home to Sunderland on 5 November 2005 meant Arsenal moved third in the league table. This was followed by a trip to the JJB Stadium; Arsenal beat Wigan Athletic 3–2 in a "hugely entertaining game on a cold, frosty afternoon". Henry scored his 100th goal at Highbury against Blackburn Rovers to extend a club unbeaten run of nine matches. Defeat at Bolton Wanderers in early December concerned Wenger, admitting the opponents showed the template required to beat his team. A further defeat against Newcastle United, where Gilberto Silva was sent off in the second half highlighted the "physical absence" of Vieira in midfield. In losing 2–0 to Chelsea a week after – their third successive defeat for the first time under Wenger, Arsenal lay in eighth position, 11 points behind Manchester United. An early morning kick-off away to Charlton Athletic ended in a 1–0 victory for Arsenal; José Antonio Reyes scored his second goal in the league. Four first-half goals against Portsmouth helped Arsenal to close the gap on second place by nine points. They ended the calendar year and began 2006 with goalless draws against Aston Villa and Manchester United respectively.

Arsenal recorded the biggest win of the league season, against Middlesbrough at Highbury. Henry scored a hat-trick in a 7–0 victory; the striker post-match deemed it was vital for the club to finish in the top four "…for me, for the club and for the fans." They suffered two consecutive defeats: away to Everton and at home to West Ham United. In the latter match, Campbell was substituted at his request before the second half, having been at fault for Nigel Reo-Coker and Bobby Zamora's goals. He "went missing" after the match, subsequently returning to training five days later. Emmanuel Adebayor scored his first goal for Arsenal in a 2–0 win against Birmingham City on 4 February 2006. A stoppage time goal scored by Gilberto earned the team a point against Bolton Wanderers at Highbury; they went 1–0 down in the 12th minute after Kevin Nolan chipped the ball past goalkeeper Jens Lehmann. Arsenal conceded a late goal away to Liverpool on Valentine's Day – a result which left the club 10 points behind their opponents. Defeat against Blackburn Rovers meant they lost for the second consecutive game. Having collected just three wins out of a possible 14 away from home, Wenger admitted the form of the team remained "a big worry" given they needed to play five more.

March–May

In the first week of March, Arsenal beat Fulham 4–0 with a "commanding performance" from Henry, who scored two goals. The striker scored the winning goal against Liverpool in their next match, from a Steven Gerrard backpass. A polished performance against Charlton Athletic was followed by a five-goal win at home to Aston Villa on 1 April 2006. Arsenal lost 2–0 to Manchester United and dropped two points against relegation-threatened Portsmouth, meaning a fourth-place finish was in Tottenham Hotspur's favour.

Dennis Bergkamp scored his final goal for Arsenal against West Bromwich Albion in a 3–1 win; he came on as a substitute in the second half to set up Pires to score the winning goal, moments after Nigel Quashie had leveled the scoreline; fittingly the day was dedicated to him. Arsenal drew 1–1 at home to Tottenham Hotspur, with Wenger choosing to rest players in mind for the club's Champions League semi-final. A 3–0 win away at Sunderland was overshadowed by a tackle on Abou Diaby, ruling him out for the remainder of the season. Two late goals scored by Reyes against Manchester City moved Arsenal a point behind Tottenham Hotspur in fourth. In the final competitive match played at Highbury, Arsenal faced Wigan Athletic, needing to better their rivals result to guarantee Champions League qualification. Henry scored a hat-trick in a six-goal match, helping Arsenal end the season with 67 points from 38 matches. Tottenham Hotspur's defeat against West Ham United meant Arsenal finished fourth, a position Gilberto felt the club "deserved".

Match results

Classification

Results summary

Results by round

FA Cup

Arsenal entered the competition in the third round, receiving a bye as a Premier League club. Their opening match was a 2–1 home win against Cardiff City on 7 January 2006, with both goals scored by Pires. Arsenal faced Bolton Wanderers the following round; an understrength team lost 1–0 after Giannakopulos headed in the winning goal, six minutes from the end of the match.

Football League Cup

Arsenal entered the Football League Cup in the third round, where they were drawn away to Sunderland. A 3–0 victory meant they progressed to the fourth round, where they beat First Division club Reading by an identical scoreline. Extra time and penalties was required in Arsenal's fifth round tie against Doncaster Rovers, after a 2–2 draw in 90 minutes. Two saves by goalkeeper Manuel Almunia helped Arsenal win 3–1 on penalties and reach the semi-finals of the competition for the first time since 1998. They faced Wigan Athletic, losing 1–0 in the first leg and in spite of winning the second leg 2–1 with a full strength team, Arsenal was eliminated on the away goals rule.

UEFA Champions League

Group stage

Arsenal qualified for the group stages of the Champions League in the 2005–06 season on virtue of finishing runners-up in the Premier League the preceding season. They were drawn in Group B, along with Swiss' Thun, Czech club Sparta Prague and Ajax of the Netherlands. In spite of Van Persie's dismissal against Thun in the opening group match, Arsenal won 2–1, courtesy of a late goal by substitute Bergkamp. A 2–1 win against Ajax was followed by a 2–0 victory against Sparta Prague; Henry scored both goals to surpass Ian Wright's all-time leading scorer record. A goal from Henry and two from Van Persie in the reverse fixture meant the club reached the knockout stages. A win at Thun on 22 November 2005 ensured Arsenal topped the group; they ended the group stages with a draw at Highbury against Ajax.

Knockout phase

First knockout round
The club faced Real Madrid in the last 16 – the first encounter between both clubs in the competition. A solo goal by Henry at the Estadio Santiago Bernabéu in the first leg, inflicted the home team's first defeat in 18 Champions League matches. A disciplined display at home a fortnight after helped Arsenal to reach the quarter-finals and become the sole English representative left in the competition.

Quarter-finals
At home to Juventus, Arsenal won 2–0 with goals from Fàbregas and Henry; the match was overshadowed by the return of former captain Vieira. A goalless draw at the Stadio delle Alpi meant the club progressed into the semi-finals against Villarreal.

Semi-finals
In the club's final European match at Highbury, Touré scored a first-half goal to give Arsenal a 1–0 win. A late penalty save by goalkeeper Lehmann in the second leg helped Arsenal become the first London club to reach a Champions League final. The result, another goalless draw was Arsenal's tenth clean sheet in a row – a new competition record. Campbell, returning from injury praised the team performance in his post-match interview: "It's brilliant for us. It's also great for the manager Arsène Wenger to get to the final in France – I'm sure he will get a great reception."

Final

In the final against Barcelona at the Stade de France in Saint-Denis, Paris, Arsenal fielded a 4–5–1 formation, with Eboué replacing the injured Lauren, and Cole making a return at left-back for Flamini.

Lehmann was sent off in 18th minute for a professional foul on striker Samuel Eto'o. Wenger reacted by substituting Pires for goalkeeper Manuel Almunia, altering the formation. In spite of the disadvantage, Arsenal took the lead in the 37th minute, after Henry's free kick was headed in by Campbell. Henry missed a chance in the second half to give Arsenal a two-nil lead before Eto'o equalised with 14 minutes left. Substitute Henrik Larsson set up Juliano Belletti to score the winner for Barcelona. Wenger used his post-match press conference to criticise referee Terje Hauge for sending off Lehmann, a view later shared by club captain Henry and FIFA president Sepp Blatter.

Squad statistics
Arsenal used a total of 34 players during the 2005–06 season and there were 16 different goalscorers. There were also six squad members who did not make a first-team appearance in the campaign. The team played in a 4–4–2 formation for much of the season, though Wenger deployed a 4–5–1 formation in Europe – a five-man midfield with Ljungberg playing behind the main striker Henry. Fàbregas featured in 50 matches – the most of any Arsenal player in the campaign; Lehmann started in all 38 league matches.

The team scored a total of 96 goals in all competitions. The highest scorer was Henry, with 33 goals, followed by Van Persie and Pires who both scored 11 goals. Four Arsenal players were sent off during the season: Lehmann, Fàbregas, Van Persie and Gilberto.
Key

No. = Squad number

Pos = Playing position

Nat. = Nationality

Apps = Appearances

GK = Goalkeeper

DF = Defender

MF = Midfielder

FW = Forward

 = Yellow cards

 = Red cards

Numbers in parentheses denote appearances as substitute. Players with number struck through and marked  left the club during the playing season. Players with names in italics and marked * were on loan from another club for the whole of their season with Arsenal.

Source:

See also

 2005–06 in English football
 List of Arsenal F.C. seasons

References

External links
 Arsenal play in European Cup Final at Arsenal.com

2005-06
Arsenal